The PFL 10 mixed martial arts event for the 2019 season of the Professional Fighters League, the 2019 PFL Championship, was held on December 31, 2019, at the Hulu Theater at Madison Square Garden in New York City, New York.

Background
The event was the tenth and final event of the 2019 season. Each champion in the six weight classes was crowned and won a championship prize of $1 million.

Results

2019 PFL Heavyweight playoffs

2019 PFL Light Heavyweight playoffs

2019 PFL Welterweight playoffs

2019 PFL Lightweight playoffs

2019 PFL Featherweight playoffs

2019 PFL Women's Lightweight playoffs

See also
List of PFL events
List of current PFL fighters

References

Professional Fighters League
2019 in mixed martial arts
Mixed martial arts in New York (state)
Sports in Manhattan
2019 in sports in New York (state)
December 2019 sports events in the United States
Sporting events in New York City
Mixed martial arts events